Schwartziella paradoxa is a species of minute sea snail, a marine gastropod mollusk or micromollusk in the family Zebinidae.

Description

The height of the shell attains 2.7 mm. Schwartziella paradoxa n. sp. differs from any other species of Cape Verde Schwartziella by having prominent axial ribs on first whorls of teleoconch, which are absent on last whorl. S. sculptu rata n. sp., which also has weak axial ribs on the first 2-3 whorls, is less elongate, has more evident spiral sculpture and a different protoconch microsculpture.

Distribution
This species occurs in the Atlantic Ocean off the Cape Verdes.

References

 Rolán E. & Luque Á.A. 2000. The subfamily Rissoininae (Mollusca: Gastropoda: Rissoidae) in the Cape Verde Archipelago (West África). Iberus 18(1): 78-80
 Rolán E., 2005. Malacological Fauna From The Cape Verde Archipelago. Part 1, Polyplacophora and Gastropoda.

paradoxa
Gastropods described in 2000
Gastropods of Cape Verde